{{Album ratings
| rev1 = AllMusic
| rev1Score = <ref name="allmusic">{{cite web|last1=Rivadavia|first1=Eduardo|url=https://www.allmusic.com/album/tweaked-mw0000237600|title=Tweaked|work=Allmusic|accessdate=October 22, 2017}}</ref>
| rev2 =Collector's Guide to Heavy Metal| rev2Score = 8/10
| noprose = yes
}}Tweaked is the 5th studio album and first independently released collection of new material by American rock band Enuff Z'nuff.

Having been earlier presented as a glam rock band in the midst of the grunge movement, Enuff Z'nuff fought to distinguish their sound for their first proper independent release. Although the singles "Bullet from a Gun" and "Life Is Strange" lean toward a modern alternative sound, other tracks such as "My Heroin," "Without Your Love," and "How Am I Supposed To Write A Love Song?" were recorded in more of a blues rock style.

The remaining songs from Tweaked don't veer far from the formula used on earlier Enuff Z'nuff albums. Songs such as "My Dear Dream," "We're All Alright," and "Has Jesus Closed His Eyes" utilize their obvious past influences of Electric Light Orchestra, Cheap Trick and The Beatles. However, Tweaked does mark a noticeable change in direction in that lead guitar prowess was no longer a highlight. This was either due to changing times or because of the removal of guitar prodigy Derek Frigo from the band.Tweaked was originally conceived to be half of a Japanese released double album. However, the sessions were eventually split into two records, with the other becoming Chip & Donnie's Brothers (later re-released as Enuff Z'Nuff's Seven in 1997). Artwork varies on some copies of this record due to the controversial image of an Irish funeral procession that is featured on the original release.Tweaked'' also marks the return of original guitarist Gino Martino to the band, though he would soon leave the group again due to a disdain for touring. Martino would continue to record occasionally with the band on studio material. The album was re-released in 2000 and 2008.

Track listing
All songs written by Donnie Vie and Chip Z'Nuff, except where noted.
 "Stoned" – 5:08
 "Bullet from a Gun" – 4:21
 "Mr. Jones" (Vie, Ricky Parent) – 5:35
 "My Dear Dream" (Vie) – 3:09
 "Life Is Strange" (Vie) – 4:01
 "Without Your Love" – 6:20
 "We're All Alright" – 4:52
 "It's Too Late" – 3:30
 "If I Can't Have You" – 3:29
 "Has Jesus Closed His Eyes" – 4:43
 "Style" – 3:00
 "My Heroin" (Z'Nuff) – 4:23
 "How Am I Supposed to Write a Love Song?" (Vie, Z'Nuff, Parent) – 5:53

Personnel
Enuff Z'nuff
 Donnie Vie – lead vocals, guitars and keyboards, producer
 Chip Z'Nuff – bass guitar, guitars and vocals, producer, mixing on track 10
 Gino Martino – lead guitar
 Ricky Parent – drums

Additional musicians
 Phil Miller – guitars (tracks 3 & 6)
 Zak Mischer – guitars (tracks 2 & 12)
 Derek Frigo – lead guitar (tracks 10 & 11)
 Norton Buffalo – harmonica
 Bruce Breckenfield – Hammond B-3 organ
 Vik Foxx (credited as Vic Cerny) – drums (track 11)

Production
Paul Lani – co-producer and mixing on track 11
Chris Shepard – engineer, producer and mixing on track 12
Chris Demonk – engineer, mixing on track 10
Jeff Luif, Phil Bonanno, Stefon Taylor, Tom Lipnick, Johnny K, Don Grayless, Bub Phillippe, Jim Hoffman, Mike Tholen – engineers
Eric Gast – mixing
Brian Lee – mastering

Release history

References

Enuff Z'nuff albums
1995 albums
Music for Nations albums